Gaston Fichu (18 February 1901 – 3 December 1974) was a French wrestler. He competed in the freestyle welterweight event at the 1924 Summer Olympics.

References

External links
 

1901 births
1974 deaths
Olympic wrestlers of France
Wrestlers at the 1924 Summer Olympics
French male sport wrestlers
Place of birth missing